Self Inflicted is the fourth studio album by American deathcore band Chelsea Grin. The album debuted at number 105 on the Billboard 200. This is the band's last album to feature vocalist Alex Koehler and guitarists Jake Harmond and Dan Jones before their departures in 2017 and 2018.

Style 
Allmusic noted that album contains almost no death metal elements that were present on the band's previous releases, noting that the album is a metalcore release.
This album has also been described as djent, and that it uses djent playing styles.

Release 
Self inflicted was released on July 1, 2016 by Rise Records.
The deluxe edition of Self Inflicted was released on January 27, 2017.

Reception 
Allmusic awarded the album three and a half stars out of five, noting that "Self Inflicted is as menacing and relentless as anything that Chelsea Grin has dropped thus far, a rage-fueled beatdown that's as technically sound as it is sonically punishing".

Track listing

Personnel 
Chelsea Grin
 Alex Koehler — lead vocals
 Jake Harmond — rhythm guitar
 David Flinn — bass
 Dan Jones — lead and rhythm guitar
 Pablo Viveros — drums, vocals
 Stephen Rutishauser — lead guitar

References

2016 albums
Chelsea Grin albums
Rise Records albums